Phosphatidylinositol 4-kinase type 2-beta is an enzyme that in humans is encoded by the PI4K2B gene.

References

Further reading